No Concept is the third album composed by Giovanni Allevi and was published in 2005 by the label Casa Ricordi.

Track listing 

 Go with the flow – 3:35 – 'Emotion must be left to flow: let your existence manifest itself free from obstacles, for nothing belongs to us and all is given.' – Giovanni Allevi
 Ciprea – 2:57 – 'The neat drawing and the radiant surface of this shell, recall to mind the African rhythms that inspired this extended melody.' – Giovanni Allevi
 Come sei veramente – 6:07 – 'Whoever is in love has the gift of seeing the other in all their depth, of discovering the intimate beauty even when it is obscured by daily life.' – Giovanni Allevi
 Prendimi – 2:49 – 'Running after each other until suddenly meeting: and then again, fleeing once more.' – Giovanni Allevi
 Ti scrivo – 2:45 – 'A letter written with pen and paper in the email era... takes lots of courage. Promise me you will write a real letter.' – Giovanni Allevi
 Regina dei cristalli – 2:07 – 'The pride of the Renaissance returns upon my fingers: in Music, History is a game where anything can be up to date.' – Giovanni Allevi
 Ossessione – 2:34 – 'A thousand doors open, the mind seeks thousands of solutions, but there is no way out from the obsession of a face, a memory.' – Giovanni Allevi
 Sospeso nel tempo – 1:17 – 'A tear on the garment of time is where fresh thoughts lay.' – Giovanni Allevi
 Le tue mani – 2:30 – 'Of infinite shapes and sensual dances are hands capable, thus revealing intentions and desires that cannot be avowed.' – Giovanni Allevi
 Qui danza – 2:28 – '"Here’s the rose, here it dances" (Hegel): in order not to lose itself amidst the clouds of conceptuality the absolute must descend unto daily life, revealing all its splendour in the simplicity of a rose. Dance then, celebrating the smallest things as mirrors of the infinite.' – Giovanni Allevi
 Notte ad Harlem – 5:08 – 'They say that from 125th St. onwards, at night-time one should be afraid, that's why glances veer between fear and curiosity. But the other is a fellow man like me; perhaps it is me that scares him.' – Giovanni Allevi
 Pensieri nascosti – 2:29 – 'Glances speaking of hidden thoughts.' – Giovanni Allevi
 Breath – 8:40 – 'I let my body receive the vibrations from the piano's single notes, from the lowest depths up to the head.  I listen in total silence, in the dark, with the volume turned up loud. For ten minutes I am outside of this world.' – Giovanni Allevi.

Allevi said 

"Unlike previous CD this came pouring. In fact, it seems paradoxical because it is more elaborate, but it took much less time.
It was born in extraordinary circumstances for me. I was in the Harlem neighbourhood of New York. I had fled from Italy to get away from the music of the conceptual world of the Academy.
I had this need to meet new artistic forces, most genuine, they came from the bottom. In New York, I auditioned for my concert at the Blue Note, then held six months later.
I started dreaming that concert. And thus was born 'No Concept', which is simply the transposed music from that concert. That dream has turned into compositions, because I knew that there was a prestigious international stage waiting my notes and my music."

Notes 

^  Giovanni Allevi.

2005 albums
Giovanni Allevi albums